Attavar or Attavara is a locality in Mangalore city, Karnataka, India.

Attractions and services
Attavar has some famous high rise apartments, with Casa Grande Mall being the most famous.
The following are other important points of public interest:

 The income tax offices of Mangalore division
 KMC Hospital: a large hospital run by the Kasturba Medical College of Manipal Group/MAHE
 Manipal College of Dental Sciences & Hospital (Manipal Group/MAHE)
 City Central Library: this library is run by the Mangalore City Corporation and is located close to the Nandigudda graveyard.

City buses with Route No. 27 service the area regularly.

Chakrapani Temple 

This is a famous temple dedicated to Sri Krishna in Attavar.  A locally popular annual community festival known as "Mosaru Kudike" is celebrated following Shri Krishna Janmaastami under the aegis of this temple.

Shri Umamaheshwara Temple 

Shri Umamaheshwara Temple is an ancient temple dedicated to Shiva along with Parvathi temple, which was renovated in the year 2003. The Shri Mahaganapathi idol (called "Kote Ganapathi", used by kings and soldiers to pray before they went to war about 700 to 800 years ago, as mentioned by research archaeologist Dr. Gururaja Bhat) now placed in this temple is the oldest in the Coastal Karnataka. The idol was found while digging to build a memorial building in the memory of World War II soldiers, now the District Collectors (D.C.) office Red Building. The procession of "Mosaru Kudike" during Krishna Janmastami started in the year 1909 from this temple and is now a regular annual festival.

Arasu (Daiyongulu) - Mundattaya (Vaidyanatha) Daivasthana 

This is one of the oldest daivastana in Mangalore district. Along the coastal belt it is popularly known as "Attavara Arasu-Mundattaya". The daivastana has a very old history with connection to the Jain Ballals who ruled the Mangalore state (during those days Mangalore had been referred as "Mangalooru seeme") under the Vijayanagara kingdom. The "Arasu" daiva is also called as "Daiyongulu", whereas the "Mundattaya" daiva is known by the other name "Vaidyanatha". These two daivas are of different origin. Mundattaya was originated from Attavara whereas Arasu is believed to have come from Udyavara's "Arasu-Manjishnaar" daivasthana.

Mosaru Kudike was first started in Attavar. It started with a small function with a celebration in the Vaidyanatha Daivastana. It has since become the festival of Attavar village and the celebration of the procession of Shree Krishna through Attavara. 2009 marked the hundredth year of Mosaru Kudike.

More details can be found in the "Paad^dana" which was collected by Rev. Fr. A. Manner, a German citizen, in 1886. This was published by the Basel Mission, a British missionary, during the British rule in India. The book is a very good collection of "Paad^dana" of many daivas. "Paad^dana" is a series of folk stories related to the daiva, which can be vocalized in the form of a song.

References 

 http://ganigasanghamangalore.org/umamaheshwari-temple.php 
 http://rcmysore-portal.kar.nic.in/temples/ChakrapaniTemple/AboutTemple.htm 

Localities in Mangalore